The Schneeberg, with its  high summit Klosterwappen, is the highest mountain of Lower Austria, and the easternmost and northernmost mountain in the Alps to exceed 2000 m. It is a distinctive limestone massif with steep slopes on three sides.

The Schneeberg is one of the Northern Calcareous Alps in the borderland between Lower Austria and Styria, in the eastern part of Austria.

The Schneeberg is a summit with a height of over 1500 m, which just misses the limit for an ultra-prominent peak (1500).

There are also a number of other routes for walkers, including from the spa resort of Puchberg am Schneeberg to the east, or from the south, in Höllental. On the north side of the Schneeberg there is the Fadensteig as an ascent path. For experienced hikers, the path over the Fadensteig is worthwhile. The starting point of the Fadensteig is the Edelweißhütte on the Fadensattel at an altitude of 1,235 m.

The summit plateau has a number of mountain huts which are visited by thousands of walkers, climbers and even mountain-bikers each year. There are numerous ski runs, some of them very steep, the most famous of which leads over the Breite Ries.

References

External links

 Webcams of Losenheim and Puchberg
 Webcams: Schneeberg - Fischerhütte, Damböckhaus, Losenheim
 Bergsteigen.at with information about climbing routes and huts in the Schneeberg/Rax area

Mountains of the Alps
Mountains of Lower Austria
Rax-Schneeberg Group
Two-thousanders of Austria